Eilema albicosta is a moth of the subfamily Arctiinae first described by Alois Friedrich Rogenhofer in 1894. It is found in Spain and on the Canary Islands.

Adults are on wing year round.

The larvae feed on algae, mosses, lichen and detritus.

References

Moths described in 1894
albicosta